Contact is an arts organisation in Manchester, England that focuses on youth leadership.

History
Contact was founded in 1972 by Barry Sheppard (General Manager of what was then Manchester University Theatre) and Hugh Hunt (Professor of Drama), as Manchester Young People's Theatre as part of the University of Manchester. Following a £5 million investment from Arts Council England, Contact was reopened in 1999 as an arts venue for young people. It is funded by Arts Council England, the Association of Greater Manchester Authorities, Manchester City Council and the University of Manchester, but it is independently run. Apart from traditional theatre, it now covers dance, music, poetry, spoken word, hip hop and art. Its programme includes touring work and in-house productions, co-productions and collaborations developed with Key Partner Companies and young people.

Contact is a registered charity.

Artistic Directors
 Paul Clements (founding artistic director) 
 John McGrath 1999–2008
 Baba Israel 2009–2012
 Matt Fenton 2013–current

Awards
 Stirling Royal Institute of British Architects Building Of The Year (1999)
 Arts Council Breakthrough Award: In Recognition of the Pioneering work achieved with Young People
 TMA Eclipse Award for Cultural Diversity
 Arts Council England Art04 Outstanding Achievement Award
 Arts Council England Art07 Rising Star
 TMA Award for Diversity 2013
 Co-operative RESPECT Inclusive Venue of the Year 2013
 Lever Prize Winner 2014

Architecture
Contact's distinctive building was designed by architect Alan Short and Associates as part of the venue's 1999 redesign. Arts Council England contributed £4.5 million toward the building, with matched funding from English Partnerships and land donated by the University of Manchester. It is located on Devas Street, Chorlton-on-Medlock, near the university's School of Education and Department of Drama. The main 320-seat auditorium (Space 1) was refitted and an 80-seat studio (Space 2) was added in the newly built turret.

Contacting The World
Since 2002, Contact has hosted Contacting The World, a biannual international project which brings together young people from around the world to create new theatre. Twinning companies so they can collaborate, exchange members and share ideas Contacting The World culminates in a Festival Week in July.

Contacting The World has featured companies from Malaysia, Trinidad, Nigeria, Rwanda, Palestine, Brazil, Poland, India, Sri Lanka, Pakistan, Jordan, Bangladesh, Syria, Iran, South Africa, New Zealand, The Philippines, Nepal, Zambia, Germany, Turkey, the UK and USA.

References

External links

 Contact Theatre official website
 Contacting The World

Theatres in Manchester
1972 establishments in England